Raimon Land is Thailand's leading real estate development company of
luxury and super-luxury real estate with numerous outstanding projects to its name. It mostly works on condominium buildings in Bangkok, Pattaya, and Phuket. We take pride as the pioneer to bring in innovative concepts, ideas, and designs to Thailand’s real estate market through our projects in Bangkok’s prime locations. Raimon Land has to date developed more than 20 residential properties in Thailand. In this regard, it continues to further expand its portfolio in several prime locations. Reflecting the company’s outstanding success, Raimon Land was named ‘Thailand Property Development Company of the Year’ by Frost & Sullivan Awards 2019.

History
Raimon Land was founded in year 1987. Raimon Land Public Company Limited has successfully established its position as the country’s leader in high-end real estate development, delivering residential, commercial, hospitality and retail properties. On 10 September 1993, the company was listed on the Stock Exchange of Thailand (SET) under "RAIMON" and, since May 2012, as “RML”. Currently, Mr.Korn Narongdej is acting a Chief Executive Officer (CEO) 

Buildings that the company has worked on include:
 2014: 185 Rajadamri, Bangkok
 2015: Unixx, South Pattaya
 2015: Mews Yen Akat, Bangkok
 2016: The Lofts Ekkamai, Bangkok is scheduled for completion in 2016

References

Real estate companies of Thailand
Real estate companies established in 1987